Ones All is a solo album by the bassist Dave Holland, recorded in 1993 and released on the German VeraBra label.

Reception
The AllMusic review by Tom Benton stated: "In addition to validating his stature as one of the most talented and tasteful bassists of the late 20th century, Ones All is a recording that should find an enthusiastic audience with both bass and jazz lovers alike".

Track listing
All compositions by Dave Holland except as indicated
 "Homecoming" - 4:48   
 "Three Step Dance" (Glen Moore) - 5:00   
 "Pork Pie Hat" (Charles Mingus) - 6:32   
 "Jumpin' In" - 4:23   
 "Reminiscence" - 3:22   
 "Mr. P.C." (John Coltrane) - 4:53   
 "Little Girl, I'll Miss You" (Bunky Green) - 6:55   
 "Cashel" - 5:58   
 "Blues for C.M." - 5:26   
 "Pass It On" - 5:17   
 "God Bless the Child" (Billie Holiday, Arthur Herzog, Jr.) - 4:36

Personnel
Dave Holland - bass

References

External links

1995 albums
Dave Holland albums